The Adams Mountains are a small but well defined group of mountains in Queen Alexandra Range, bounded by the Beardmore, Berwick, Moody and Bingley Glaciers. Discovered by British Antarctic Expedition (1907–09) and named Adams Mountains for Lieutenant Jameson B. Adams, second in command of the expedition. The British Antarctic Expedition (1910–13) restricted the name to Mount Adams for a high peak in the group, but the original name and application are considered more apt and have been approved.

References
 

Mountain ranges of the Ross Dependency
Shackleton Coast